Muhlis Suner (1887 – 23 September 1969) was a Turkish Kemalist politician, and a prominent member of the CHP.

References 

1887 births
1969 deaths
Place of death missing
People from Bilecik
Republican People's Party (Turkey) politicians